Gutnick is a surname. Notable people with the surname include:

Chaim Gutnick (1921–2003), Orthodox Jewish Chabad rabbi in Australia
Joseph Gutnick, (born 1948) Australian businessman and mining industry entrepreneur
Mordechai Gutnick, Orthodox Jewish rabbi in Australia
Moshe Gutnick, Australian Orthodox Chabad rabbi

See also
Dow Jones & Co. Inc. v Gutnick